The Aztec or Nahuatl script is a pre-Columbian writing system that combines ideographic writing with Nahuatl specific phonetic logograms and syllabic signs which was used in central Mexico by the Nahua people.

Origin
The Aztec writing system derives from writing systems used in Central Mexico, such as Zapotec script. Mixtec writing is also thought to descend from Zapotec. The first Oaxacan inscriptions are thought to encode Zapotec, partially because of numerical suffixes characteristic of the Zapotec languages.

Structure and use
Aztec was pictographic and ideographic proto-writing, augmented by phonetic rebuses. It also contained syllabic signs and logograms. There was no alphabet, but puns also contributed to recording sounds of the Aztec language. While some scholars have understood the system not to be considered a complete writing system, this is disputed by others. The existence of logograms and syllabic signs is being documented and a phonetic aspect of the writing system has emerged, even though many of the syllabic characters have been documented since at least 1888 by Nuttall. There are conventional signs for syllables and logograms which act as word signs or for their rebus content. Logosyllabic writing appears on both painted and carved artifacts, such as the Tizoc Stone. However, instances of phonetic characters often appear within a significant artistic and pictorial context. In native manuscripts, the sequence of historical events is indicated by a line of footprints leading from one place or scene to another.

The ideographic nature of the writing is apparent in abstract concepts, such as death, represented by a corpse wrapped for burial; night, drawn as a black sky and a closed eye; war, by a shield and a club; and speech, illustrated as a little scroll issuing from the mouth of the person who is talking. The concepts of motion and walking were indicated by a trail of footprints.

A glyph could be used as a rebus to represent a different word with the same sound or similar pronunciation. This is especially evident in the glyphs of town names.  For example, the glyph for Tenochtitlan, the Aztec capital, was represented by combining two pictograms: stone (te-tl) and cactus (nochtli).

Aztec Glyphs do not have a set reading order, unlike Maya hieroglyphs. As such, they may be read in any direction which forms the correct sound values in the context of the glyph. However, there is an internal reading order in that any sign will be followed by the next sign for the following sound in the word being written. They do not jumble up the sounds in a word.

Numerals
The Aztec numerical system was vigesimal. They indicated quantities up to twenty by the requisite number of dots. A flag was used to indicate twenty, repeating it for quantities up to four hundred, while a sign like a fir tree, meaning numerous as hairs, signified four hundred. The next unit, eight thousand, was indicated by an incense bag, which referred to the almost innumerable contents of a sack of cacao beans.

Historical
Aztecs embraced the widespread manner of presenting history cartographically. A cartographic map would hold an elaborately detailed history recording events. The maps were painted to be read in sequence, so that time is established by the movement of the narrative through the map and by the succession of individual maps.

Aztecs also used continuous year-count annals to record anything that would occur during that year. All the years are painted in a sequence and most of the years are generally in a single straight line that reads continually from left to right. Events, such as solar eclipses, floods, droughts, or famines, are painted around the years, often linked to the years by a line or just painted adjacent to them. Specific individuals were not mentioned often, but unnamed humans were often painted in order to represent actions or events.  When individuals are named, they form the majority of the corpus of logosyllabic examples.

See also
Aztec codices
Damago Soto
Hieroglyph
Nahuatl language

Notes

References

Further reading

Mesoamerican writing systems
Aztec
Obsolete writing systems
Proto-writing